"I'll Do 4 U" is a song by American hip hop artist Father MC, with background vocals by R&B artist Mary J. Blige. The song was recorded for Father MC's debut album Father's Day and released as the second single for the album in October 1990. It samples "Got To Be Real" by Cheryl Lynn.

Track listings
12", Vinyl
"I'll Do 4 U" (Radio Version) - 3:03
"I'll Do 4 U" (Extended Version) - 5:04
"I'll Do 4 U" (Acappella) - 5:06

12", Vinyl (Promo)
"I'll Do 4 U" (Radio Version) - 3:03
"I'll Do 4 U" (Radio Instrumental) - 3:03
"I'll Do 4 U" (Extended Version) - 5:04
"I'll Do 4 U" (Extended Instrumental) - 5:04
"I'll Do 4 U" (Acappella) - 5:06

Personnel
Information taken from Discogs.
executive production: Andre Harrell, Sean Combs
production: Mark Morales, Mark C. Rooney

Chart performance

Weekly charts

Year-end charts

References

1990 songs
1990 singles
Father MC songs
Uptown Records singles
MCA Records singles
New jack swing songs
Songs written by David Foster
Songs written by David Paich
Song recordings produced by Cory Rooney